Philip George Michael August (born 8 May 1949) is a former English cricketer.  August was a left-handed batsman who fielded as a wicket-keeper.  He was born in Enfield, Middlesex.

August made his debut for Bedfordshire against Shropshire in the 1975 Minor Counties Championship.  He played Minor counties cricket for Bedfordshire from 1975 to 1986, making 71 Minor Counties Championship appearances and 5 MCCA Knockout Trophy appearances.  He made his List A debut against Somerset in the 1982 NatWest Trophy.  In this match, he was not required to bat, with Somerset winning by 4 wickets.  He made a further List A appearance against Gloucestershire in the 1985 NatWest Trophy.  He scored 16 runs in this match, before being dismissed by Courtney Walsh.

His father, George, also played Minor counties cricket for Bedfordshire, as well as first-class cricket for the Minor Counties cricket team.

References

External links

1949 births
Living people
People from Enfield, London
English cricketers
Bedfordshire cricketers
Wicket-keepers